Jim Clarke (born August 11, 1954) is a Canadian former professional ice hockey defenceman. Clarke played the 1975–76 season with the Phoenix Roadrunners of the World Hockey Association (WHA). As a youth, he played in the 1967 Quebec International Pee-Wee Hockey Tournament with the Toronto Faustina minor ice hockey team.

References

External links

1954 births
Living people
Beauce Jaros players
Canadian ice hockey defencemen
Ice hockey people from Toronto
Phoenix Roadrunners draft picks
Phoenix Roadrunners (WHA) players
Toronto Marlboros players
Tucson Mavericks players
Tulsa Oilers (1964–1984) players
Vancouver Canucks draft picks
Canadian expatriate ice hockey players in the United States